King George is a census-designated place (CDP) in and the county seat of King George County, Virginia, United States. It is sometimes referred to as King George Courthouse, because it is the location of the King George County Courthouse. The population as of the 2020 census was 4,970.  The Journal Press was a local weekly newspaper published in King George and serving local areas until its final issue was published on Jan 11th, 2017.

King George is also home to the Naval Surface Warfare Center Dahlgren Division (NSWCDD) located in the northeast portion of the county along the Potomac River.

Geography
The community is in central King George County along Virginia State Route 3, which leads west  to Fredericksburg and southeast  to Warsaw.

Attractions

The King George Fall Festival, begun in 1959, is held annually the second weekend of October, to benefit the fire and rescue squad.  It includes a parade through town, a carnival, a craft fair, a car show, a dance, a 5-K run, and the Fall Festival Queen Pageant.  The town has a YMCA recreational facility. Also, every Saturday morning, the King George middle school hosts a farming market. The King George high school is the largest building in the town.

The Ralph Bunche High School, Powhatan Rural Historic District, Rokeby, Nanzatico, Office Hall and Millbank are listed on the National Register of Historic Places.

References 

Census-designated places in King George County, Virginia
County seats in Virginia
Northern Neck
Census-designated places in Virginia